Hermann Lomba (born 11 October 1960 in Pointe-a-Pitre, Guadeloupe) is a retired French athlete who specialised in the 200 meters. He competed at the 1991 World Championships in Athletics.

References

French male sprinters
1960 births
Guadeloupean male sprinters
French people of Guadeloupean descent
People from Pointe-à-Pitre
Living people
Athletes (track and field) at the 1996 Summer Olympics
Olympic athletes of France
European Athletics Championships medalists
World Athletics Championships athletes for France